A list box is a  graphical control element that allows the user to select one or more items from a list contained within a static, multiple line text box. "Control-clicking" an item that has already been selected, unselects it.

A list box is called select or select1 in the XForms standard.  Select is used for allowing the user to select many items from a list whereas select1 only allows the user to select a single item from a list.

HTML
<select multiple>
  <option>List item 1</option>
  <option>List item 2</option>
  <option>List item 3</option>
  <option>List item 4</option>
  <option>List item 5</option>
  <option>List item 6</option>
</select>

See also
Drop down list - Like a list box, but not permanently expanded to show the elements of the list.
Combo box - Like a drop down list, but users also can make entries not on the list.
Scrollbar

References

Graphical control elements